The Syria Turkmen Bloc or Syrian Turkmen National Bloc, is one of the two major opposition movements of Syrian Turkmens. The party is headed by Yusuf Molla.

The party was founded in Istanbul in February 2012. Still in the foundation phase, it suffered an early split, leading to the emergence of the Syrian Democratic Turkmen Movement. A reconciliatory meeting in December 2012 laid the grounds to the formation of the Syrian Turkmen Assembly. Since then, the Syrian Turkmen Bloc focussed on its remaining strongholds in Latakia and Bayır-Bucak, while the Syrian Democratic Turkmen Movement focusses on Aleppo.

The founding conference was supported by Mazlum-Der, a foundation linked to the Turkish AKP. After its foundation, the party joined the National Change Current (a coalition of smaller opposition parties). The representatives of the Syria Turkmen Bloc participated in the meetings for the Syrian Turkmen Assembly.

The Syria Turkmen Bloc is also associated with the Turkmen troops of Nurettin Zengi, Zahir Baybars, Al Huva Billa, Yavuz Sultan Selim, Sultan Mehmet the Conqueror, Memduh Colha, Bin Tamime, Katip Al Mustafa, Firsan Tevhid, Sukur ul Turkmen (Turkmen Falcons), which are all under the control of Brigade of Turkmen Mountain led by Muhammad Awad in the Latakia province.

References

Bibliography

2012 establishments in Turkey
National Coalition of Syrian Revolutionary and Opposition Forces
Political parties established in 2012
Political parties in Syria
Political parties of minorities in Syria
Syrian National Council
Syrian Turkmen organizations